The 2018 Grand Prix Cycliste de Québec was a road cycling one-day race that took place on 7 September 2018 in Canada. It was the 9th edition of the Grand Prix Cycliste de Québec and the 33rd event of the 2018 UCI World Tour. It was won in the sprint by Michael Matthews before Greg Van Avermaet and Jasper Stuyven.

Results

References

2018 UCI World Tour
2018 in Canadian sports
2018
September 2018 sports events in Canada